Zhao Yanni (born 27 November 1986 in Yantai, Shandong province, China) is a female Chinese long-distance runner who specializes in the 3000 metres steeplechase. She won the gold medal at the 2007 Asian Championships, and represented China at the 2008 Summer Olympics, coming in 16th with a time of 10:36.77 minutes.

Her personal best time is 9:43.60 minutes, achieved in June 2008 in Suzhou, China. In the 3000 metres, she has 9:12.49 minutes, achieved in October 2006 in Yantai, China.

References

External links

Zhao Yanni at Baidu Baike

1986 births
Living people
Chinese female long-distance runners
Runners from Shandong
Olympic athletes of China
Athletes (track and field) at the 2008 Summer Olympics
Chinese female steeplechase runners
Sportspeople from Yantai